JIPR may refer to:

 Jerusalem Institute for Policy Research
 Journal of Intellectual Property Rights